F.G. Boys High School No 1 Multan, with the full name of Federal Government Boys High School No 1 Multan, is a secondary school located in the Cantonment area of Multan (city), in the Punjab Province of eastern Pakistan.

It is run by the Federal Government of Pakistan.

References

Schools in Multan